Roadkill Bill is a comic created by Ken Avidor. The cartoon has an anti-car theme and frequently advocates the theories of Ivan Illich.

The main character, Roadkill Bill, is a squirrel with distinctive tire tracks across his torso and tail.

The cartoon ran weekly for nearly four years in the Twin Cities alternative newspaper, Pulse of the Twin Cities from 1999 until December 2003, and has been published in book form by Carbusters Magazine, proponent of the car-free movement.

Roadkill Bill was listed on Funny Timess list "A Few of Our Favorite Things" / "Writer, Cartoonist and Contributor Links".

Gallery

References

1999 comics debuts
2003 comics endings
Comics about politics
Fictional squirrels
Comics about animals
Male characters in comics
Comics characters introduced in 1999